Madurai Thirumalai Nambi Seshagopalan (born, 5 September 1948) is a noted Carnatic singer, musician and composer. He was awarded the Madras Music Academy's Sangeetha Kalanidhi in 2006. As well as being a master of the veena and harmonium, he is an exponent of harikatha.

Early life
Though T. N. Seshagopalan uses 'Madurai' in front of his name, he was actually born in Nagapattinam, Tamil Nadu. He first learnt under his mother, and later under tutelage of Ramanathapuram C. S. Sankarasivan. He holds a degree in science from Madras University and a degree in music from Madurai Kamaraj University where he later served as professor of music.

Music career
He is proficient in rendering Harikatha and performs as per the guruparampara of Harikesanallur Muthiah Bhagavatar. Seshagopalan continues to increase his wide repertoire with compositions of his own. He is noted for his own elegant thillanas, bhajans, namavalis and abhangs. He is equally at home with North Indian ragas and has participated in several jugalbandhis. Noted singer Gayathri Girish is his disciple.

Tours
In 1984 he was invited to sing at the Adelaide International Festival in Australia (and included performances Perth, Adelaide, Sydney and New Zealand). In 1987 he was India's cultural ambassador to Russia. He has performed in countries like Singapore, Malaysia, Bahrain and Sri Lanka and has visited and performed in the United States of America numerous times.

Film
In 1983 he produced and played hero in a Tamil movie "Thodi Raagam". He also acted as Prashanth's father in Jambhavan (2006).

Awards and titles
Harikatha Chudamani awarded by the Krishna Gana Sabha in the presence of Sri Jayendra Saraswathi of Kanchi Kamakoti Peetam Sep 2014
Gayaka Sikhamani awarded by Chodiah Memorial Trust Mysore in January 2007
Sangeetha Kalanidhi 2006 awarded by Madras Music Academy
Padma Bhushan - 2004
"SangeetaSaagara" by CMANA, NJ, USA 2007
Sulakshana Gana Vichkshana - by H. H. Srimad Andavan Swamigal Srirangam - 1993
Sangeetha Kalasikhamani, by The Indian Fine arts Society, Chennai - 2000
Kumaragandharva Rashtriya Sanmaan - Kumaragandhrva Foundation Mumbai 2002
Nadhabrahmam - Indian Fine Arts Texas USA - 2002
Musician of the Year 1999-2000 by Sangeet Natak Akademi
President Award 2000 - by Sangeet Natak Academy, Central Government
Tiruppugazh Mani in 1964
Gana Bhoopathi by the Tamil Sangam of Olavakod in 1967
Sangeetha Kala Sagaram by Sri Jayendra Saraswathi of Kanchi Kamakoti Peetam
Kalaimamani by Tamil Nadu Government in 1984
Isai Selvam by Chief Minister of Tamil Nadu, Mr. Karunanidhi.
Isai Kalai Vendan by Australian Foundation of Canberra - 1998

References

External links
Madurai T. N. Seshagopalan interview

1948 births
Living people
Male Carnatic singers
Carnatic singers
Recipients of the Padma Bhushan in arts
Harikatha exponents